This is a list of former municipalities of Switzerland, i.e. municipalities of Switzerland that no longer exist.

In 1850, Switzerland had 3203 municipalities. On 1 January 2022, the number was 2148.

List

Notes and references

Switzerland

Government of Switzerland
Municipalities, former
-Former